The following is a list of notable hospitals in Metro Manila''', Philippines.

City of Manila

Amisola Maternity Hospital – Hermosa Street, Manuguit, Tondo
Canossa Health and Social Center Foundation, Inc. – E. Jacinto Street, Magsaysay Village, Tondo
Chinese General Hospital and Medical Center – Blumentritt Road, Santa Cruz
Clinica Arellano General Hospital – Doroteo Jose Street, Santa Cruz
De Ocampo Memorial Medical Center – Nagtahan Street, Santa Mesa
Dr. Jose Fabella Memorial Hospital – Lope de Vega Street, Santa Cruz
Dr. Mirando Unciano, Sr. Medical Center – V. Mapa Street, Santa Mesa
Esperanza Health Center – Santa Mesa
F. Lanuza Health Center and Lying–in Clinic – Alvarez Street, Santa Cruz
GAT Andres Bonifacio Memorial Medical Center – Delpan Street, Tondo
Hospital of the Infant Jesus – Laong Laan Street, Sampaloc
Jose R. Reyes Memorial Medical Center – San Lazaro Compound, Rizal Avenue, Santa Cruz
Justice Jose Abad Santos General Hospital – Numancia St. Binondo Manila
Manila Doctors Hospital – 667 United Nations Avenue, Ermita
Maria Clara Health Center and Lying–in Clinic – Maria Clara corner Prudencio Streets, Sampaloc
Mary Chiles General Hospital – Dalupan Street, Sampaloc
Mary Johnston Hospital – Juan Nolasco Street, Tondo
ManilaMed (formerly Medical Center Manila) – General Luna Street, Ermita
Metropolitan Medical Center – Masangkay Street, Tondo
New Manila District Hospital – Pad. Peo, Santa Cruz
Nephrology Center of Manila – San Andres Street corner Leon Guinto Street, Malate
Ospital ng Maynila Medical Center – Quirino Avenue corner Roxas Boulevard, Malate
Ospital ng Sampaloc – Geronimo Street, Sampaloc
Ospital ng Tondo – Jose Abad Santos Avenue, Tondo
Our Lady of Lourdes Hospital – P. Sanchez Street, Santa Mesa
Pedro Gil Health Center and Lying–in Clinic – A. Francisco Street corner Perlita Street, San Andres
Perpetual Help Hospital – Laong Laan Street, Sampaloc
Perpetual Succor Hospital – Cayco Street, Sampaloc
Philippine General Hospital – Taft Avenue, Ermita
Presidential Security Group Station Hospital – Malacañang Park
Saint Jude Hospital and Medical Center – Don Quijote corner Dimasalang Streets, Sampaloc
San Lazaro Hospital – Quiricada Street, Santa Cruz
Santa Ana Hospital – New Panaderos Street, Santa Ana
Seamen's Hospital – Cabildo corner San Jose Streets, Intramuros
The Family Clinic, Inc. – Maria Clara Street, Sampaloc
Tondo Foreshore Health Center – Pacheco Street corner Santa Fe Street, Tondo
Tondo Health Center – Gagalangin, Tondo
Tondo Medical Center – Kalakal Street, Balut, Tondo
Trinity Woman and Child Center "The Birthplace" – New Panaderos Street, Santa Ana
Unciano General Hospital
United Doctors Medical Center – near Mabuhay Rotonda
University of Santo Tomas Hospital – Arsenio Lacson Avenue, Sampaloc

Caloocan
Acebedo General Hospital – Gen. Luis Street, Bagbaguin, JRM
Baesa Advent Polyclinic and General Hospital – Retiro Street corner Baesa Road
Bazarte Well Family Midlife Clinic – San Isidro, Camarin
Col. Salvador T. Villa Memorial Hospital – Caimito Road
Committee of German Doctors – Phase 8A, Bagong Silang
Dante's Well Family Midlife Clinic – Bagong Silang
Dr. Jose N. Rodriguez Memorial Hospital – Administration Site, Tala
Fernandez General Hospital – F. Roxas, Grace Park
Francisca dela Cruz Well Family Midwife Clinic – Caybiga
Jean Demegillo Maternity and Lying–in Clinic – J. P. Ramoy Street, Talipapa
John Paul Hospital – M. Ponce Street, Tirad Pass
Lady of Lourdes Hospital of Caybiga, Inc. – Caybiga
MCU–Filemon Dionisio Tanchoco Medical Foundation Hospital – EDSA
Martinez Memorial Hospital – Mabini Street
Nephrology Center of Caloocan Dialysis Center, Inc. – Barangay 86, District II, Calaanan East
Nodado General Hospital – Area A, Camarin
North Caloocan Doctors' Hospital – Bangkers Village 2, Quirino Highway
Our Lady of Grace Hospital – 8th Avenue corner F. Roxas Street, Grace Park
President Diosdado Macapagal Memorial Medical Center – Mabini Street
Ronn–Carmel Hospital and Fertility Control Center – Ponce Street
San Lorenzo General Hospital – Barangay 170, Zone 15, Deparo
Fabella

Las Piñas
Perpetual Help Medical Center- Alabang-Zapote Road, Pamplona III
Las Piñas Doctors Hospital
Las Piñas General Hospital and Satellite Trauma Center
Pope John Paul II Hospital and Medical Center
Las Piñas City Medical Center
Christ the King Medical Center Unihealth Las Piñas

Makati
Centuria Medical Makati
Makati Medical Center – Amorsolo Street, Legazpi Village
Ospital ng Makati - Sampaguita Street, Pembo
St. Claire's Medical Center – Dian Street cor. Boyle Street, Palanan

Mandaluyong
Asia Renal Care Philippines, Inc. – EDSA corner Reliance Street
Jocson Well Family Midwife Clinic – Barangka Drive, Barangka
Health Delivery Systems, Inc. (UNILAB DOTS Center) – Shaw Boulevard
Mandaluyong City Medical Center – Boni Avenue
National Center for Mental Health – Nueve de Pebrero Street
Nephro Systems Philippines, Inc. – Eastgate Center, EDSA
Perez–Mendoza Birthplace Lying–in Clinic – Blue Mansion Building, Boni Avenue
Unciano General Hospital (Mandaluyong Branch) – Boni Avenue
Victor R. Potenciano Medical Center – EDSA
Divine Mercy The Home That Cares Inc. Psychiatric Custodial Hospital – Boni Avenue

Marikina
Amang Rodriguez Memorial Medical Center
Garcia General Hospital
Marikina Doctors Hospital and Medical Center
Marikina Valley Medical Center
St. Anthony Medical Center
St. Victoria Hospital
St. Vincent General Hospital
Sta. Monica General Hospital

Muntinlupa
Alabang Medical Center – Alabang–Zapote Road
Alabang Medical Clinic–Muntinlupa Branch – National Highway, Putatan
Asian Hospital and Medical Center – Civic Drive, Filinvest City, Alabang
Babaran–Echavez Medical and Psychiatric Clinic – Amparo Street, Poblacion
Beato Cauilan Hospital – Villa Carolina, National Highway
Clinic Systems, Inc. – Montillano Street, Alabang
League of Government Information Practitioners of the Philippines, Inc. – Alabang
Medical Center Muntinlupa – National Road, Putatan
New Bilibid Prisons Hospital – Bureau of Corrections
Ospital ng Muntinlupa – Filinvest Civic Drive, Filinvest City, Alabang
Research Institute for Tropical Medicine – Filinvest City, Alabang
San Roque Medical Clinic – Montillano Street, Alabang

Parañaque
Medical Center Paranaque – Dr. A. Santos Avenue, Sucat Road
Olivarez General Hospital – Dr. A. Santos Avenue, Sucat Road
Ospital ng Parañaque – Quirino Avenue, La Huerta
Our Lady of Peace Hospital – Coastal Road, San Dionisio
Protacio Medical Services – Quirino Avenue, Tambo
South Superhighway Medical Center – West Service Road, South Superhighway
Sta. Rita de Baclaran Hospital – G. Cruz Street, Baclaran
Sto. Niño de Cebu Maternity Hospital – Sucat Road
UHBI – Parañaque Doctors' Hospital – Doña Soledad Avenue, Better Living Subdivision
Unihealth Paranaque Hospital and Medical Center – Dr. A. Santos Avenue, Sucat Road (front of San Antonio Valley 1 Village)

Pasay

Adventist Medical Center Manila – Donada Street
Pasay City General Hospital – P. Burgos Street
San Juan de Dios Hospital – 2772 Roxas Boulevard

Pasig
Alfonso Specialist Hospital – P. Sixto Antonio Avenue
Glen Eagles Healthcare – San Miguel Avenue, Ortigas Center
Health Solutions Corporation – San Miguel Avenue, Ortigas Center
Javillonar Clinic and Hospital – Dr. Pilapil Street, Sagad
John F. Cotton Hospital – Ortigas Avenue
Medcor Pasig Hospital and Medical Center  – Santolan, 10 Evangelista St., Pasig, NCR, Philippines
Metro Psych Facility – P. Sixto Antonio Avenue
Mission Hospital – Ortigas Avenue, Rosario
Mother Regina Hospital – Madona Street, Doña Juana Subdivision, Rosario
Pasig City General Hospital – F. Legazpi Street, Maybunga
Pasig Doctors Medical Center – 254 A. Rodriguez Avenue, Manggahan
Pasig Medical and Maternity Hospital Foundation – London Street, Pasig Green Park, Manggahan
Rizal Medical Center – Pasig Boulevard
Sabater General Hospital – Caruncho Avenue
Salve Regina General Hospital – Marcos Highway, De la Paz
Saint Threse Hospital – C. Raymundo Avenue, Maybunga
St. Camillus Medical Center, Amang Rodriguez Avenue, Santolan
The Medical City – Ortigas Avenue
Wellness Pro, Inc. – San Miguel Avenue corner Lourdes Street

Pateros
Allied Care Experts (ACE) Medical Center – Pateros, Inc. – 884 P. Herrera St., Aguho

Quezon City

Ann Francis Maternity Hospital – Quirino Highway, Novaliches
AFP Medical Center – V. Luna Road, Barangay Central
Bernardino General Hospital – Quirino Highway, San Bartolome, Novaliches
Bernardino General Hospital II – Kaligayahan, Novaliches
Camp General Emilio Aguinaldo Station Hospital – Camp General Emilio Aguinaldo
Capitol Medical Center – Quezon Avenue corner Scout Magbanua Street, Diliman
Casaul General Hospital – Tandang Sora Avenue, Sangandaan, Novaliches
Commonwealth Hospital and Medical Center – Commonwealth Avenue
Cruz–Dalida Maternity Hospital – Jordan Plain, Novaliches
De Los Santos–STI Medical Center – E. Rodriguez Boulevard
Dihmesco General Hospital – General Luna Street
Diliman Doctors Hospital – Commonwealth Avenue
Dr. Fe del Mundo Medical Center Foundation Philippines – Banawe Street
Dr. Carlos Lanting Hospital – Novaliches
Dr. Jesus C. Delgado Memorial Medical Center – Kamuning Road
Dr. Montano Ramos General Hospital – Bukidnon Street, Bagong Bantay
East Avenue Medical Center – East Avenue, Diliman
Fairview General Hospital – Fairview Avenue corner Mercury Street, Fairview
Far Eastern University – Nicanor Reyes Medical Foundation Medical Center – Regalado Avenue, West Fairview
General Miguel Malvar Medical Foundation Hospital – Commonwealth Avenue
J. P. Sioson General Hospital and Colleges, Inc. – Bukidnon Street, Bagong Bantay
Lung Center of the Philippines – East Avenue
National Children's Hospital – E. Rodriguez Boulevard
National Kidney and Transplant Institute – East Avenue
Neopolitan General Hospital – Quirino Highway, Lagro
New Era General Hospital – Commonwealth Avenue, New Era
Nodado General Hospital – Zabarte Subdivision, Kaligayahan, Novaliches
Novaliches District Hospital – Quirino Highway, San Bartolome, Novaliches
Novaliches General Hospital – Quirino Highway, Gulod, Novaliches
OCW General Hospital – Tandang Sora Avenue, Culiat
PNP General Hospital – Camp Crame, EDSA
PNP General Hospital Annex – Camp Panopio B. Tuazon
Pascual General Hospital – Baesa
Philippine Children's Medical Center – Quezon Avenue
Philippine Heart Center – East Avenue, Diliman
Philippine Orthopedic Center – Maria Clara corner Banawe Streets, Santa Mesa Heights
Philippine Oncology Center Corporation – Dahlia Street, West Fairview
Providence Hospital – Quezon Ave., West Triangle
Quezon City General Hospital – Seminary Road
Queensberry Hospital – Ramirez Street, Novaliches
Quezon Institute – E. Rodriguez Boulevard
Quirino Memorial Medical Center – Project 4, P. Tuazon corner Katipunan Avenue
St. Luke's Medical Center – E. Rodriguez Boulevard
Saint Agnes General Hospital – Roosevelt Avenue
San Lorenzo General Hospital – Pasong Putik, Novaliches
Santa Teresita General Hospital – D. Tuazon Street
United Doctors Medical Center – España Boulevard corner Ramirez Streets
University of the East Ramon Magsaysay Memorial Medical Center – Aurora Boulevard
University of the Philippines Medical Services – Diliman
Valdez–Padron Hospital – Gulod, Novaliches
Villarosa Hospital – Salalilla Street, Project 4
Veterans Memorial Medical Center – North Diliman
World Citi Medical Center – Aurora Boulevard

San Juan
Cardinal Santos Medical Center – Wilson Street, Greenhills West
Saint Martin de Porres Charity Hospital – A. Bonifacio Street
San Juan Medical Center – N. Domingo Street

Taguig

Cruz–Rabe General Hospital – Gen. Luna Street, Tuktukan
Dr. Sabili General Hospital and Health Services – Gen. Santos Avenue, Lower Bicutan
Fort Bonifacio General Hospital – Fort Bonifacio
Holy Mary Family Hospital – M. L. Quezon Street, Bagumbayan
Jovince Medical Hospital – East Service Road, Western Bicutan
St. Luke's Medical Center Global City – Bonifacio Global City
Manila Naval Hospital – Bonifacio Naval Station, Fort Bonifacio
Medical Center Taguig – Cayetano Boulevard, Ususan
Recuenco General Hospital - North Signal Village
Taguig Doctors Hospital – Bagumbayan
Taguig–Pateros District Hospital (formerly Taguig City Hospital) – East Service Road, Western Bicutan
Dr. Evilio Iquit Memorial Hospital – Signal Village

Valenzuela
Angelus Medical and Maternity Clinic – Que Grande Street, Ugong
Calalang General Hospital – R. Valenzuela Street
Carlos Clinic – Palasan Street
Fatima Medical Center – MacArthur Highway
F and P Hernandez Maternity and Lying–in Clinic – MacArthur Highway, Marulas
Pasolo Maternity and Medical Clinic – Pasolo Street
Saint John's Hospital – Malinta
Sanctissimo Rosario General Hospital – Espiritu Street, Marulas
Valenzuela City Emergency Hospital – Poblacion, Polo
Valenzuela City General Hospital – Padrigal Street, Karuhatan
Vian Family Hospital – Que Grande Street, Ugong

References

See also
List of hospitals in the Philippines

Metro Manila

Hospitals
Manila